Oakview and Oakview may refer to:

Communities
Oak View, California
Oakview (Holly Springs, Mississippi), listed on the NRHP in Mississippi
Oakview, Missouri, a village
Oakview Heights, West Virginia

Buildings
Oak View, Norwood, Massachusetts
Oak View Mall

See also
Oak View Elementary School
Oak View Group
OakView Preservation Incorporated